Gigo (Garbage in Garbage Out), commonly known as The GIGO EP, is an extended play by Nigerian rapper Eva Alordiah. It was released for free digital download on November 20, 2011, by 3UD. The EP features collaborations with Saucekid, Shank, Xvol, Basketmouth, Chigul, Ikechukwu, Sossick, Bigfoot, Gray Jon’z, and Tintin. It comprises nine tracks and was supported by the singles "I Done Did It", "Down Low", "Garbage Out (Your Fada)" and "High".

Background and cover art
In an interview posted on The Nigerian Voice website, Eva described the EP as a project that explores her love for the different types of music she's being infused with. By releasing the EP, she believes she's giving back to society in her own way. In another interview with the Weekly Trust newspaper, Eva said she recorded the EP in order to create different sounds that are true to her image as an artist. She also said she was influenced by several music genres, including rap, afrobeat, dancehall and R&B. The EP's artwork and photography were designed by Ugo Daté and Obi Somto, respectively.

Recording and releases
Eva started working on the The GIGO EP as an independent artist. The Sossick-produced track "I Done Did it" was released as the EP's lead single. In an interview with Halley Bondy of MTV Iggy in 2012, Eva said she was honored to have worked with the aforementioned producers and that she had fun recording the EP. 
 
Eva released the EP's second single "High" in 2012. The music video for the song was  directed by Mex and uploaded to YouTube on May 24, 2012; it premiered on MTV Base that same month. Following the song's release, many people misconstrued its meaning and thought it alluded to drug use and drug abuse. In the aforementioned interview with MTV, Eva said the song is about overcoming the struggles and hardships of life.

In April 2014, Eva released Eva Says, a mini video series that include live performances of songs from the EP.

Track listing

Notes
"—" denotes a skit

Personnel

Elohor Eva Alordiah – primary artist, writer 
Sossick – record producer 
Bigfoot – record producer
Gray Jon’z – record producer
Tintin – record producer 
Saucekid – featured artist, skit 
Shank – featured artist
Xvol – featured artist
Ikechukwu – featured artist
Basketmouth – skit 
Chigurl – skit  
Obi Somto – artwork photographer 
Ugo Daté – artwork designer

Release history

References

2011 debut EPs